Severa is a professional services automation tool.

Severa may also refer to:
 Santa Severa, a frazione of the comune of Santa Marinella, in the province of Rome, Lazio, Italy 
 A Severa (film), a 1931 Portuguese film by Leitão de Barros
 Pravda Severa, Russian Arkhangelsk-based newspaper, published since 1917

People with the surname
 Aquilia Severa, second and fourth wife of Emperor Elagabalus
 Claudia Severa, literate Roman woman, the wife of Aelius Brocchus
 Ernst Severa (born 1934), Austrian sprint canoer
 Leopoldo Felíz Severa, Puerto Rican politician and senator
 Marcia Otacilia Severa, Empress of Rome and wife of Emperor Marcus Julius Philippus or Philip the Arab
 Maria Severa-Onofriana (1820–1846), fado singer
 Marina Severa (died before 375), Empress of Rome and first wife of Emperor Valentinian I 
 Ronald Severa (born 1936), American water polo player

See also
 Euterebra severa, a species of sea snail
 Mackenziaena severa, a species of bird
 Thelcticopis severa, a species of huntsman spider
 La severa matacera, a Colombian musical group formed in Bogotá at the end of 1995